NFL UK was a television news programme based on the sport of American football. The show was broadcast in the United Kingdom on Five.

The show was hosted by Trevor Nelson and Natalie Pinkham with Nat Coombs as a reporter.

References

NFL Network original programming
2000s British sports television series
2009 British television series debuts